Cactus Jack Records is a record label founded by American rapper and singer Travis Scott. The label's current acts include Scott, Sheck Wes, Don Toliver, SoFaygo and WondaGurl.

The label also has their own publishing division, Cactus Jack Publishing.

History
In March 2017, Travis Scott announced he would be launching his own imprint, under the name of Cactus Jack Records. During an interview, Scott said, "I'm not doing it to have financial control over my music. I want first and foremost to help other artists, launch new names, to provide opportunities. I want to do for them what happened to me, but better." In September 2017, Smokepurpp signed to the label, but left sometime later in 2019. On December 21, hip-hop duo Huncho Jack (consisting of Scott and Quavo of the hip-hop trio Migos), released their debut album Huncho Jack, Jack Huncho under the label. Huncho Jack, Jack Huncho charted at number 3 on the Billboard 200.

In February 2018, the label signed Sheck Wes in a joint deal with Interscope Records and Kanye West's label GOOD Music. On March 10, Wes announced his debut studio album titled Mudboy, which was released on October 5. On August 3, Scott released his third studio album Astroworld. Later that month, Don Toliver was signed to the label after appearing on the Astroworld song "Can't Say". Astroworld charted at number one on the Billboard 200, while Mudboy reached number 17.

On November 29, 2019, Scott announced the label's first compilation album titled JackBoys, which was released on December 27.

On March 13, 2020, Toliver released his debut studio album titled Heaven or Hell under the label which was supported by three singles: "No Idea", "Can't Feel My Legs" and "Had Enough". The album charted at number 7 on the Billboard 200. On April 24, Scott and Kid Cudi released a song titled "The Scotts" under the duo name same as the title. On July 21, Canadian record producer and close collaborator WondaGurl signed a worldwide publishing deal with Cactus Jack's publishing division, Cactus Jack Publishing and Sony/ATV Music Publishing, in conjunction with her own record label and publishing company, Wonderchild Music.
 
In February 2021, SoFaygo had signed to Travis Scott's label Cactus Jack Records, around the same time his hit song 'Knock Knock' began to gain traction. Since then, he had been working on his upcoming debut studio album called 'Pink Heartz', which he would eventually end up releasing on November 11, 2022.  In July, Scott opened up a new cannabis farm known as Cactus Farm.

On June 24, 2021, Scott announced a collaboration between Cactus Jack and the fashion brand Dior which its menswear collection was revealed the following day on a live stream that also showcased snippets of Scott's upcoming fourth studio album, Utopia. In late September 2021, Toliver and Chase B announced they would be releasing their own solo projects titled Life of a Don and Escapism respectively in October. Toliver later released Life of a Don on the 8th of that month. The album charted at number two on the Billboard 200.

On October 17, 2022, SoFaygo announced the release date of his debut studio album Pink Heartz for November 11 as well as releasing 4 singles from the album.

In January 2023, it was announced that Cactus Jack will host the NBA All-Stars Weekend event at Salt Lake City, Utah with Smith Entertainment Group.

Notable artists

Current

Former

In-house producers

Discography
The label has officially released six studio albums and one compilation album.

Studio albums

Compilation albums

Other charted songs

References

Record labels established in 2017
American record labels
Vanity record labels
Epic Records
2017 establishments in Texas
American companies established in 2017